Morfa Dyffryn beach is on the west coast of Wales, between Barmouth and Harlech in Gwynedd. This sandy beach is several miles long and is chiefly known for having an officially recognised naturist area,  in length. The beach is very clean and is also known for regular sightings of dolphins.

The nearest settlements are the villages of Dyffryn Ardudwy and Llanbedr where several camp and caravan sites and guest-houses are available.

Naturism at Morfa Dyffryn
Naturism has been practised at Morfa Dyffryn since the late 1930s. The beach can attract several hundred naturists in summer during fine weather - despite which, it is rarely crowded. Most visitors come from North Wales and North West England, although visitors from mainland Europe are not unknown.

In 2000, after complaints from local residents of indecent exposure on other parts of beach and the access footpaths, steps were taken to designate a clearly marked 1 kilometre length of the beach as officially naturist. Although the official designation was resisted by some local residents, complaints of indecent exposure and related behaviour have markedly decreased since 2000. The naturist section of the beach is now clearly marked by signs at both ends.

Another complaint by naturists relates to the ban on naturist sunbathing in the sand dunes. Traditionally, most families and heterosexual couples have sunbathed on the beach while most gay men and many single heterosexual men have sunbathed on the dunes. Patrols by the police or beach patrol take place, and usually result in sunbathers being instructed to move down from the dunes onto the beach.

The naturist section of the beach is up to 30 minutes' walk from the nearest car parks.

References

External links
 NUFF (Naturist UK Fact File) article on Morfa Dyffryn

Dyffryn Ardudwy
Llanbedr
Beaches of Gwynedd
Beaches of Snowdonia
Nature reserves in Gwynedd
Nature reserves in Snowdonia
Sites of Special Scientific Interest in East Gwynedd
National nature reserves in Wales
Nude beaches